Grundy Center is a city in Grundy County, Iowa. The population was 2,796 at the time of the 2020 census, a 7.7% increase from 2,596 at the 2000 census. Grundy Center is also the county seat of Grundy County. 
Grundy Center is part of the Waterloo–Cedar Falls Metropolitan Statistical Area.

Places of interest
Often simply called "Grundy", the town has three public education centers. Kindergarten through fourth grade is in the primary building, while grade levels 5-12 are located at the Jr-Sr High School. The community preschool is located in the former middle school building just next to the current primary building. The YMCA and early childhood center also share that building. The city of Grundy Center also has three public parks, Bel Pre, Orion, and Liberty Park. Located just south of the Liberty Park is the city swimming pool, that is open only in the summer months. The Herbert Quick School House is a historic building in Grundy Center, located within Orion city park.

History
Grundy Center was incorporated on April 17, 1877, and was named for the county, which was named for Felix Grundy, congressman and senator from Tennessee.

Geography
Grundy Center is located at  (42.361058, -92.773550).

Climate

According to the Köppen Climate Classification system, Grundy Center has a hot-summer humid continental climate, abbreviated "Dfa" on climate maps.

Demographics

2010 census
At the 2010 census there were 2,706 people in 1,162 households, including 739 families, in the city. The racial makup of the city was 98.6% White, 0.2% African American, 0.1% Asian, 0.1% Pacific Islander, and 1.0% from two or more races. Hispanic or Latino of any race were 0.4%.

Of the 1,162 households 29.4% had children under the age of 18 living with them, 51.8% were married couples living together, 8.8% had a female householder with no husband present, 3.0% had a male householder with no wife present, and 36.4% were non-families. 32.4% of households were one person and 17.1% were one person aged 65 or older. The average household size was 2.26 and the average family size was 2.86.

The median age was 42.9 years. 22.9% of residents were under the age of 18; 6% were between the ages of 18 and 24; 23.1% were from 25 to 44; 25.3% were from 45 to 64; and 22.7% were 65 or older. The gender makeup of the city was 46.3% male and 53.7% female.

2000 census
At the 2000 census there were 2,596 people in 1,103 households, including 737 families, in the city. The racial makup of the city was 99.23% White, 0.04% African American, 0.15% Asian, and 0.58% from two or more races. Hispanic or Latino of any race were 0.54%.

Of the 1,103 households 26.7% had children under the age of 18 living with them, 57.8% were married couples living together, 7.0% had a female householder with no husband present, and 33.1% were non-families. 30.5% of households were one person and 18.6% were one person aged 65 or older. The average household size was 2.27 and the average family size was 2.83.

22.4% are under the age of 18, 6.2% from 18 to 24, 22.9% from 25 to 44, 23.0% from 45 to 64, and 25.5% 65 or older. The median age was 44 years. For every 100 females, there were 85.8 males. For every 100 females age 18 and over, there were 81.0 males.

The median household income was $37,222 and the median family income was $46,223. Males had a median income of $32,414 versus $23,788 for females. The per capita income for the city was $18,859. About 3.8% of families and 4.5% of the population were below the poverty line, including 2.0% of those under age 18 and 7.4% of those age 65 or over.

Education
Grundy Center Community School District operates area public schools.

Media
The Grundy Register was formed in 1923, and is a weekly newspaper published in Grundy Center.

Notable people

Robert Hugh Willoughby, classical flutist

 Ed Wilson, chief meteorologist for WHO-DT

See also

 Ziggy Hasbrook

References

External links

City website
Grundy Register

 
Cities in Iowa
Cities in Grundy County, Iowa
County seats in Iowa
Waterloo – Cedar Falls metropolitan area